Campus PD was an American television show on G4. The show was produced by the UK-based production company Cineflix Productions, who also produced American Pickers (which airs on the History Channel in the United States) as well as Canadian Pickers (which airs on Canada's History Television).

The show was similar in style and tone to the TV series Cops. Unlike Cops, Campus PD focused specifically on college and university campuses and towns and the authorities who patrol them, either using local police departments or the on-campus police departments maintained autonomously by the universities themselves. Filming takes place at various locations across the country. The theme song for the first two seasons was The Clash song "Police on My Back".

From January 10, 2017 to the Fall season, reruns of Campus PD were seen on cable network Spike.

Season 1 locations
Florida State University: Tallahassee, Florida
University of Cincinnati: The University of Cincinnati is an inner-city college with an enrollment of over 41,000. Agencies followed: University of Cincinnati Police Department; Cincinnati Police Division - District 5.
Texas State University: Texas State's main campus is in San Marcos, a community of over 50,000 people about halfway between Austin and San Antonio. Located on the edge of the Texas Hill Country, Texas State's 30,000+ students enjoy a setting unique among Texas universities.
California State University, Chico: The university, commonly called "Chico State", is the second-oldest campus in the California State University system. The university also manages  Big Chico Creek Ecological Reserve and the  Butte Creek Ecological Reserve.

Season 2 locations
Florida State University: Tallahassee, FL
University of Cincinnati: The University of Cincinnati is an inner-city college with an enrollment of over 41,000. Agencies followed: University of Cincinnati Police Department; Cincinnati Police Division - District 5.
New Mexico State University: The Las Cruces Police Department, also known as the LCPD, is the principal law enforcement agency of Las Cruces, New Mexico, under the jurisdiction of the city council and city manager of Las Cruces. It is the second largest municipal police department in New Mexico, with an authorized strength of 180 officers. Las Cruces Police Department shares responsibility with the New Mexico State University Police Department for the safety of students within the Las Cruces area.
University of Central Arkansas: The University of Central Arkansas, a state-run institution located in the city of Conway, is the fourth largest university by enrollment in the state of Arkansas, and approximately 10% of UCA's more than 10,000 students belong to one of 21 Greek organizations hosted by the campus.  The UCA Police Department has primary jurisdiction on all university properties, and practices the philosophy of community-oriented policing. The PD's relationships with community members are one of the most important tools used to accomplish its primary mission—to promote and maintain a safe and secure environment for UCA students, faculty, staff and visitors.
Northern Kentucky University: Northern Kentucky University, a growing metropolitan university of more than 15,000 students, is located in the quiet suburb of Highland Heights. Kentucky, but is only seven miles southeast of Cincinnati.  Agency followed: Highland Heights Southgate Police Authority.
Binghamton University: The Binghamton Police Department currently has 141 sworn officers and 10 civilian employees. The Patrol Division is the largest component of the Binghamton Police Department, and is composed of 74 officers and 15 Supervisors. The Binghamton Police Department answered 66,305 calls for service in 2008.

Season 3 locations
 Washington State University
 New Mexico State University
 Northern Michigan University
 Montclair State University
 University of Cincinnati
 University of West Georgia
 University of South Carolina
 Indiana University of Pennsylvania
 Indiana State University

Season 4 locations
University of North Carolina-Greensboro
Indiana University of Pennsylvania
New Mexico State University

Indiana University of Pennsylvania (IUP) helicopter accident

On April 30, 2011 a helicopter associated with Campus PD crashed into student housing in Indiana, Pennsylvania, where the show was gathering video for a segment on Indiana University of Pennsylvania.  FAA spokesman Jim Peters was quoted as stating that all the people on the helicopter had injuries ranging from minor to critical with two crew members and the pilot having serious to critical injuries and one crew member being able to walk away from the wreckage. The pilot was taken to Allegheny General Hospital (North Side) in Pittsburgh but his condition was not confirmed by a hospital spokesperson.  The three passengers were all Canadian citizens. On May 24, 2011 one of the injured, Greg Jacobsen, died at Memorial Medical Center in Johnstown, PA from complications of his injuries. Jacobsen suffered multiple injuries and died of respiratory problems that developed during his recovery. Students inside the housing had to be relocated for the rest of Finals Week.

University spokeswoman Michelle Fryling said that Campus PD was working with Indiana Borough Police and IUP President Werner issued a statement that said IUP police were not involved and that "We are relieved that there were no injuries to students or others on the ground.  The university was neither consulted nor involved in any arrangements related to this project."

Campus PD used footage shot at IUP, but did not use any footage shot from the helicopter. The show ended the season with a memorial episode to Jacobsen.

Episode guide

Season 1
The first season consisted of 10 episodes.

Season 2
The second season premiered on Wednesday, September 1 at 8PM ET.

Season 3

Season 4

References

External links
Campus PD (G4 website)

2009 American television series debuts
2012 American television series endings
2000s American crime television series
2010s American crime television series
Documentary television series about policing
G4 (American TV network) original programming